There are 84 mammal species (with two uncertain) recorded in Sweden according to the IUCN Red List. Two are endangered, one is vulnerable as well now extinct, and four are near threatened.

The following tags are used to highlight each species' conservation status as assessed by the International Union for Conservation of Nature:

Even-toed ungulates 

Even-toed ungulates are members of the order Artiodactyla. The even-toed ungulates are ungulates whose weight is borne about equally by the third and fourth toes, rather than mostly or entirely by the third as in perissodactyls. There are about 220 artiodactyl species, including many that are of great economic importance to humans.

Family: Bovidae 
 European bison, Bison bonasus  extirpated
 European mouflon, Ovis aries musimon introduced
 Muskox, Ovibos moschatus  reintroduced

Family: Cervidae 
 Eurasian elk, Alces alces 
 Roe deer, Capreolus capreolus 
 Red deer, Cervus elaphus 
 European fallow deer, Dama dama  introduced
 Reindeer, Rangifer tarandus

Family: Suidae 
 Wild boar, Sus scrofa

Carnivorans 

There are over 260 species of carnivorans, the majority of which feed primarily on meat. They have a characteristic skull shape and dentition.

Family: Canidae 
 Grey wolf, Canis lupus 
 Raccoon dog, Nyctereutes procyonoides  introduced
 Arctic fox, Vulpes lagopus 
 Red fox, Vulpes vulpes

Family: Ursidae 
 Brown bear, Ursus arctos

Family: Felidae 
 Eurasian lynx, Lynx lynx

Family: Mustelidae 
 Wolverine, Gulo gulo 
 Eurasian otter, Lutra lutra 
 European pine marten, Martes martes 
 European badger, Meles meles 
 Stoat, Mustela erminea 
 Least weasel, Mustela nivalis 
 European polecat, Mustela putorius 
 American mink, Neogale vison  introduced

Family: Phocidae 
 Grey seal, Halichoerus grypus 
 Harbour seal, Phoca vitulina 
 Ringed seal, Pusa hispida

Whales, dolphins and porpoises 

The order Cetacea includes whales, dolphins and porpoises. They are the mammals most fully adapted to aquatic life with a spindle-shaped nearly hairless body, protected by a thick layer of blubber, and forelimbs and tail modified to provide propulsion underwater.

Family: Balaenopteridae 
 Common minke whale, Balaenoptera acutorostrata 
 Fin whale, Balaenoptera physalus 
 Humpback whale, Megaptera novaeangliae

Family: Delphinidae 
 Long-finned pilot whale, Globicephala melas 
 Risso's dolphin, Grampus griseus 
 Atlantic white-sided dolphin, Lagenorhynchus acutus 
 White-beaked dolphin, Lagenorhynchus albirostris 
 Common bottlenose dolphin, Tursiops truncatus

Family: Monodontidae 
 Beluga whale, Delphinapterus leucas

Family: Phocoenidae 
 Harbour porpoise, Phocoena phocoena

Family: Ziphiidae 
 North Atlantic bottlenose whale, Hyperoodon ampullatus 
 Sowerby's beaked whale, Mesoplodon bidens 
 Cuvier's beaked whale, Ziphius cavirostris

Bats 

Bats are members of the order Chiroptera. The most distinguishing feature of bats is that their forelimbs are developed as wings, making them the only mammals capable of flight. Bat species account for about 20% of all mammals.

Family: Vespertilionidae 
 Western barbastelle, Barbastella barbastellus 
 Northern bat, Eptesicus nilssonii 
 Serotine, Eptesicus serotinus 
 Bechstein's bat, Myotis bechsteinii 
 Brandt's bat, Myotis brandtii 
 Pond bat, Myotis dasycneme 
 Daubenton's bat, Myotis daubentonii 
 Greater mouse-eared bat, Myotis myotis 
 Whiskered bat, Myotis mystacinus 
 Natterer's bat, Myotis nattereri 
 Lesser noctule, Nyctalus leisleri 
 Common noctule, Nyctalus noctula 
 Nathusius' pipistrelle, Pipistrellus nathusii 
 Common pipistrelle, Pipistrellus pipistrellus 
 Soprano pipistrelle, Pipistrellus pygmaeus 
 Brown long-eared bat, Plecotus auritus 
 Grey long-eared bat, Plecotus austriacus 
 Parti-coloured bat, Vespertilio murinus

Lagomorphs 

The lagomorphs comprise two families, Leporidae (hares and rabbits), and Ochotonidae (pikas). Though they can resemble rodents, and were classified as a superfamily in that order until the early 20th century, they have since been considered a separate order. They differ from rodents in a number of physical characteristics, such as having four incisors in the upper jaw rather than two.

Family: Leporidae 
 European hare, Lepus europaeus  introduced
 Mountain hare, Lepus timidus 
 European rabbit, Oryctolagus cuniculus  introduced

Rodents 

Rodents are members of the order Rodentia. Rodents make up the largest order of mammals, with over 40% of mammalian species. They have two incisors in the upper and lower jaw which grow continually and must be kept short by gnawing.

Family: Castoridae 
 Eurasian beaver, Castor fiber

Family: Cricetidae 
 European water vole, Arvicola amphibius 
 Norway lemming, Lemmus lemmus 
 Field vole, Microtus agrestis 
 Tundra vole, Microtus oeconomus 
 Bank vole, Myodes glareolus 
 Grey red-backed vole, Myodes rufocanus 
 Northern red-backed vole, Myodes rutilus 
 Wood lemming, Myopus schisticolor 
 Muskrat, Ondatra zibethicus  introduced

Family: Dipodidae 
 Northern birch mouse, Sicista betulina

Family: Gliridae 
 Hazel dormouse, Muscardinus avellanarius

Family: Muridae 
 Yellow-necked mouse, Apodemus flavicollis 
 Wood mouse, Apodemus sylvaticus 
 Eurasian harvest mouse, Micromys minutus 
 House mouse, Mus musculus 
 Brown rat, Rattus norvegicus  introduced
 Black rat, Rattus rattus  introduced

Family: Sciuridae 
 Eurasian red squirrel, Sciurus vulgaris

Shrews, hedgehogs and moles 

Eulipotyphlans are insectivorous mammals. Shrews and solenodons resemble mice, hedgehogs carry spines, gymnures look more like large rats, while moles are stout-bodied burrowers.

Family: Erinaceidae 
 Western European hedgehog, Erinaceus europaeus

Family: Soricidae 
 Eurasian water shrew, Neomys fodiens 
 Common shrew, Sorex araneus 
 Laxmann's shrew, Sorex caecutiens 
 Even-toothed shrew, Sorex isodon 
 Eurasian least shrew, Sorex minutissimus 
 Eurasian pygmy shrew, Sorex minutus

Family: Talpidae 
 European mole, Talpa europaea

See also
 List of birds of Sweden
 List of chordate orders
 Lists of mammals by region
 List of prehistoric mammals
 Mammal classification
 Mammals described in the 2000s

References

External links
 
 

Sweden
Mammals
Mammals
Sweden